The Box Elder County Courthouse is a courthouse at 1 N. Main St. in Brigham City, Utah. It was built in 1857 and expanded greatly in 1910. The 1910 addition includes Classical Revival architecture designed by local architects Andrew Funk and Carson Wells and provides the architecturally significant portion of the building. The building is significant as the only courthouse in the county and for having held all departments of the county government over the years. It is asserted to be the best example of Neo-Classical Revival architecture in the city and in Box Elder County.
 
It was listed on the National Register of Historic Places in 1988.

References

Courthouses on the National Register of Historic Places in Utah
Neoclassical architecture in Utah
Government buildings completed in 1857
County courthouses in Utah
National Register of Historic Places in Box Elder County, Utah
Buildings and structures in Brigham City, Utah
1857 establishments in Utah Territory